Sab0t is a Mexico City based tabloid pamphlet focused on art, activism, experimental narratives, media and net-culture. It is edited collectively using open source software, by members of the Possibleworlds.org virtual community, which is an economically self-sustained media initiative of the Fiction Department (Departamento de Ficción).

Issue 0 was introduced in summer 2005 during a media art exhibition by Daniel García-Andujar and Fran Ilich. In 2007 the publication was presented at Documenta 12 magazines, and during the first semester of 2007 published an issue on la Otra Cultura of The Other Campaign of the Zapatista Army of National Liberation.

References

External links
 Sab0t official web
 »Another culture« is possible–not impossible!, A conversation about Sab0t between Fran Ilich and Cornelia Sollfrank
 Otra Cultura website
 Official Ezln website
 website of Documenta 12 Magazines

2005 establishments in Mexico
Visual arts magazines
Magazines established in 2005
Mass media in Mexico City
Magazines published in Mexico
Spanish-language magazines
Magazines about the media